Nitinat Lake is a large lake and inlet on the southwestern coast of Vancouver Island, British Columbia, Canada.

The southern end of the lake lies in Pacific Rim National Park Reserve, which also contains Nitinat Hill on the lake's northern shore and Nitinat Cone on the southern shore. Hitchie Creek Provincial Park and Nitinat Lake Ecological Reserve lie on opposite sides of the lakeshore about a third of the way from the lake's northern shore and the point where Nitinat River flows into the lake. On the lake's eastern shore lie Mt. Rosander and the foot of Carmanah Mountain, the eastern part of which is in Carmanah Walbran Provincial Park.

Tidal bores (ocean waves travelling up the lake) occur on the narrows, the heights of which depend on tide heights, and these can be dangerous. The small First Nations village of Whyac lies on the southern lakeshore beside Nitinat Narrows and just north of the First Nations village of Clo-oose, also on the coast.

The main volume of Nitinat Lake is salt water, with a thin layer of less dense fresh water floating on top.

Recreation
Nitinat Lake has consistent winds that offer some of the best kiteboarding  and windsurfing in North America, attracting kiteboarders and windsurfers from around the world.

Nearby lakes
There are many smaller lakes close to Nitinat Lake. Many of them, such as Hobiton Lake, Squalicum Lake, Tsuiat Lake, and Cheewhat Lake lie completely within Pacific Rim National Park Reserve, while others such as Doobah Lake and Sprise Lake lie between Pacific Rim National Park and Carmanah Walbran Provincial Park.

See also
List of lakes of British Columbia

External links
 Unofficial website (last update on webarchive. March 7th, 2016)
 Tourism information (consulted on July 20th, 2018)
 Information on the Cowichan and Nitinat lakes and valleys (consulted on July 20th, 2018)

References

Lakes of Vancouver Island
Lakes of British Columbia
Barclay Land District